Highway: 30 Years Of America is the third principal major label compilation album by American folk rock duo America, released by Rhino Records in 2000.  The collection represented the first boxed set release of America's material.  Originally, the collection was to promoted as including four discs, including newly recorded material, but was scaled back to three discs shortly before release.  

The resulting collection was heavily tilted toward the Warner Bros. releases, with the remainder of the group's career relegated to a portion of the third disc.  No material from Human Nature, and only one track from Alibi, was included.  All songs which charted on the Billboard Hot 100 chart are represented with the exception of the group's 1982 hit, "Right Before Your Eyes".  The collection notably contains a demo of "Ventura Highway" prior to the addition of the famous guitar riff for which it is best known.  Only two previously unreleased tracks were included in the 64-track set: "Mitchum Junction" and "James Holladay".

Track listing

Disc One

Disc Two

Disc Three

("Satan" was released on America as "Donkey Jaw".)

References

2000 compilation albums
America (band) albums
Rhino Records compilation albums